These hits topped the Ultratop 50 in 2009.

See also
List of Ultratop 40 number-one hits of 2009

Notes
 Turkish entry to the 2009 Eurovision Song Contest
 Winner of 2009 Eurovision Song Contest

References

Ultratop 50
Belgium Ultratop 50
2009